is a Japanese former professional footballer who played as a goalkeeper and retired aged 28.

Career
Fukushima attended Senshu University from 2012 and became a designated special player for Urawa Red Diamonds in the 2015 season. He then signed permanently for Urawa for the 2016 season and played there for six seasons. He also went out on loan twice, firstly to J3 League club Gainare Tottori for the 2016 season and finally for Kyoto Sanga FC in the 2021 season.

Whilst at Gainare Tottori, he made his J.League debut in a 2-0 defeat to Grulla Morioka.

He kept a clean sheet on his first appearance for Urawa, in a 0-0 draw with Sanfrecce Hiroshima in the 2018 J.League Cup. His one and only J1 League appearance came near the end of the 2019 season, in a 1-0 defeat to Kashima Antlers. He also made one appearance in the AFC Champions League, which came in the following game to his J1 League debut.

In February 2022, Fukushima announced his retirement and left to work for one of Urawa Reds' partner companies, Bunka Shutter.

Club statistics

References

External links
Profile at Urawa Red Diamonds

Profile at Gainare Tottori

1993 births
Living people
Senshu University alumni
People from Seto, Aichi
Association football people from Aichi Prefecture
Japanese footballers
J1 League players
J3 League players
Urawa Red Diamonds players
Gainare Tottori players
Kyoto Sanga FC players
Association football goalkeepers
Universiade bronze medalists for Japan
Universiade medalists in football